C.D. Chalatenango has had  many coaches in its history.

The majority of coaches Chalatenango have had have been Salvadorians. Of the coaches to have managed Chalatenango, TBD have been Salvadorians and TBD foreigners.  In some cases, the Salvadorian coaches have been former players of the club that agreed to take charge after the sacking of the regular coach that season.

The main nationalities of the coaches of Chalatenango barring Salvadorians; have been Argentina (2 coaches) and Uruguayan (2).  The club has also had a Serbian, a Guatemalan and a Honduran.

C.D. Chalatenango's coaches
Information correct as of match played March 3, 2017. Only competitive matches are counted.

A.D. Chalatenango's coaches
'Information correct as of match played November 24, 2021. Only competitive matches are counted.''

External links
  (details the champion winning coaches)
 

Chalatenango